is a series of Japanese social network games developed by Happy Elements K.K. The games are all collectible card games with visual novel elements, mainly written by Japanese novelist Akira. It was first launched as a GREE game in November 2012, and was released for Android and iOS devices in 2013. Service for the original version was terminated in 2015. Service for Ensemble Girls!! was planned to end in November 2017, but this was pushed back to February 2018. Later that year, Happy Elements released an app called Ensemble Girls !! ~ Memories ~ that allows players to browse the story.

Plot 
Kimisaki Private Academy is an elite girls' school which planned to become a coeducational school in the coming academic year. The player is a second-year student newly transferred to Kimisaki as the only male student of the school. The player enjoys the new school life, helps the girls to solve problems and crisis, and later finds out the reason why he transferred to Kimisaki.

Music 
 Ensemble Girls!! Theme Song "Let's Make☆Ensemble!" (Japanese: あんさんぶるガールズ!! テーマソング 『れっつめいく☆あんさんぶる！』)
 Song by：Merry-melody & Misaki (メリメロマル) (Voiced by: Ayaka Ōhashi、Azusa Tadokoro、Chinatsu Akasaki)

 "Seinarukana, Kurokitsukinoshizuku" (Japanese『聖ナルカナ、黒キ月ノ雫』)
 Song by：Kimisaki Light Music Club (君咲学院軽音部) (Voiced by: Risa Shimizu、Mikako Komatsu、Megumi Han、Hisako Kanemoto)

See also

 Ensemble Stars!, a spin-off game featuring male idols

References

External links 
 あんさんぶるガールズ！ 公式サイト (Ensemble Girls! official website - Japanese)

2012 video games
Android (operating system) games
Digital collectible card games
IOS games
Japan-exclusive video games
Video games developed in Japan
Video games set in Japan